M. Tamilkudimagan was an Indian politician and Member of the Tamil Nadu Legislative Assembly. He served as Speaker of the Assembly from 1989 to 1991. His original name was Sathiah.

He was the DMK Minister for Tamil Language and Culture in the 1996 Cabinet. (1996-2001).

Notes 

Living people
Speakers of the Tamil Nadu Legislative Assembly
Dravida Munnetra Kazhagam politicians
Tamil Nadu MLAs 1996–2001
State cabinet ministers of Tamil Nadu
Year of birth missing (living people)